Claus Flemming Frederik Brandt Jensen (19 September 1914 – 30 November 1965) was a Danish rower. 

Jensen was born in 1914 in Copenhagen. He competed at the 1936 Summer Olympics in Berlin with the men's coxed four and came sixth. He died in 1965.

References

1914 births
1965 deaths
Danish male rowers
Olympic rowers of Denmark
Rowers at the 1936 Summer Olympics
Rowers from Copenhagen
European Rowing Championships medalists